Omps is an unincorporated community that lies along U.S. Route 522 in Morgan County, West Virginia, USA. Omps previously had a post office that operated between 1887 and 1973.

The community was named after one Mr. Omps, an original owner of the town site.

Attractions
Omps features the entrance to the Cacapon Resort State Park. It has proximity to a number of other notable locations, such as Berkeley Springs.

References 

Unincorporated communities in Morgan County, West Virginia
Unincorporated communities in West Virginia